Anolis chrysolepis, the goldenscale anole, is a species of lizard in the family Dactyloidae. The species is found in Guyana, Suriname, French Guiana, and Brazil.

References

Anoles
Reptiles of Guyana
Reptiles of Suriname
Reptiles of French Guiana
Reptiles of Brazil
Reptiles described in 1837
Taxa named by André Marie Constant Duméril
Taxa named by Gabriel Bibron